The champions and runners-up of the All England Open Badminton Championships Gentlemen's Doubles tournament, first introduced to the championship in 1899. From 1915 to 1919, and from 1940 to 1946, no competition was held due to the two World Wars.

History
In the Amateur era, George Alan Thomas (1906, 1908, 1910, 1912–1914, 1921, 1924, 1928) holds the record for the most titles in the Gentlemen's Doubles, winning All England nine times. Finn Kobberø holds the record for most consecutive titles with five from 1960 to 1964.

Since the Open era of badminton began in late 1979 with the inclusion of professional badminton players from around the world in 1980, Kim Moon-soo and Park Joo-bong (1985–1986), Li Yongbo and Tian Bingyi (1987–1988), Rexy Mainaky and Ricky Subagja (1995–1996), Marcus Fernaldi Gideon and Kevin Sanjaya Sukamuljo (2017–2018), Hiroyuki Endo and Yuta Watanabe (2020–2021) share the record for most consecutive victories with just two. In fact, Park managed the feat twice with the second of his double coming in 1989–1990, achieved with different partners.

Ray Stevens, Mike Tredgett, Tjun Tjun, Johan Wahjudi and Thomas Kihlström are the only players in history to reach the All England Open Badminton Gentlemen's Doubles Final in both the Amateur and Open era. Stevens managed to so twice while partnering Tredgett who managed the feat four times, without triumphing whereas Tjun and Wahjudi managed to do so a total of six times, Kihlström twice, with all three of them winning once in the Open era.

Finalists

Amateur era

Open era

Statistics

Multiple titles
Bold indicates active players.

Champions by country

Trivia
 In 1914 Guy A. Sautter played under the alias U. N. Lapin.
 In 1920 Archibald Englebach played under the alias A. Fee.
 The most back-to-back finals ever reached in men's doubles was achieved by Raymond M. White when he reached 8 consecutive finals between 1931 and 1938, a record he holds till this day:

See also
 List of All England men's singles champions
 List of All England women's singles champions
 List of All England women's doubles champions
 List of All England mixed doubles champions

References

External links
 All England Champions 1899-2007
 BadmintonEngland.co.uk
 badmintoneurope.com
 

All England Open Badminton Championships